Robin Miles is an American actor, casting director, audiobook narrator and audiobook director. Miles has acted in Broadway shows and on TV shows including Law & Order and Murder by Numbers. She is best known for her audiobook narrations and narration director work for which she has won numerous awards, including Audie Awards, AudioFile Golden Voice, and Earphone Awards. Miles is revered in her field and is credited as one of the audiobook narrators saving the publishing industry. In 2017, Miles was inducted into Audible's Narrator Hall of Fame. Miles also has a voice training school, VOXpertise, for aspiring narrators. She has narrated over 300 books.

Miles specializes in recreating "accents and speech patterns from around the globe."

Life and career 
Robin Miles grew up in New Jersey and credits her immigrant neighborhood for immersing her in a rich world of accents, languages and cultures which she has been able to draw on for her narration work. Miles started in musical theater, but transitioned to drama. Miles graduated from Yale University with a Bachelor of Arts in Theater Studies and she earned her Master of Fine Arts in Drama from Yale School of Drama.

After graduating and moving to New York City, Miles was looking for community service volunteer opportunities. She started book narration by volunteering to read for the American Foundation for the Blind and the National Library Service.

When she started narration work, Miles was surprised by how ethnically segregated the work was considering it is voice work."It was like, 'You do the black books, and you're Jewish, you do the Jewish books.' I was totally shocked," she says. "But, it's kind of morphed. It really started out with such a small pool of people, that the people they had did everything whether or not they could handle the accent and culture. And then, when a little more diversity came in, it was like, well nobody can do anything outside of their yard. And now, I think we're also beginning to hopefully, break through that again."Miles has narrated a wide range of genres including children's books, non-fiction, fantasy, horror, historical fiction, biography and other genres including the Young Reader's Edition of Kamala Harris's The Truths We Hold.

Reviews 
"What's the best way to tie together a space opera written alternately by four authors? Clearly, it's choosing the capable Robin Miles to narrate....Miles creatively utilizes dialects to differentiate the denizens of several planets that revolve around a dying sun." AudioFilemagazine of The Vela, 2019

"Robin Miles gives a flawless emotional narration of this superb novel, set in Ethiopia in 1974 and in 1935, on the eve of Mussolini's invasion. Mengiste's beautiful writing already draws fully formed characters; Miles adds yet another dimension to their inner lives by slowing and quickening her voice strategically, adding suspense and fervor to their experiences, particularly those of the tormented protagonist." AudioFile magazine review of The Shadow King, 2019

"The eloquence of Maaza Mengiste's tribute to the forgotten women warriors who defended Ethiopia from Mussolini's invasion in 1935 is unforgettably conveyed by the narrator Robin Miles, whose upbringing in the ethnic melting pot of New Jersey has enhanced her gift for entering into character." The Times UK, 2020 

"Miles, who has narrated works by Roxane Gay, Bell hooks, and N, K, Jemisin, excels at technically perfect Standard American dialect but interjects just enough slightly sarcastic pauses and subtly acerbic inflections to emphasize the true meaning of the text." New York Times, 2020

Awards and honors 
In 2014, Booklist named Miles a Voice of Choice narrator. AudioFile magazine has also named Miles a Golden Voice narrator. In 2017, she was inducted into Audible's Narrator Hall of Fame.

Awards

"Best of" lists

References 

African-American actresses
American stage actresses
American television actresses
American voice actresses
Audiobook narrators
Living people
Year of birth missing (living people)
21st-century African-American people
21st-century African-American women